Gorgyra mocquerysii, or Mocquery's leaf sitter, is a butterfly in the family Hesperiidae. It is found in Guinea, Sierra Leone, Liberia, Ivory Coast, Ghana, Nigeria, Cameroon, Gabon, the Republic of the Congo, Angola, the Central African Republic, the Democratic Republic of the Congo, Uganda, western Kenya, western Tanzania and northern Zambia. The habitat consists of forests and riparian vegetation.

References

Butterflies described in 1896
Erionotini
Butterflies of Africa